Bianca Beetson is an Australian contemporary artist.

Life and career 

Bianca Beetson was born in Roma, Western Queensland. She is an Indigenous Australian of the Kabi Kabi nation of the Sunshine Coast in South East Queensland. She studied and obtained a Bachelor of Arts in visual arts at the Queensland University of Technology from 1993 to 1995. She completed her Honours in 1998 and was awarded a Doctorate of visual arts at Griffith University in 2018.

She established herself as an artist for contemporary Australian aboriginal art and lives and works in Brisbane. Her work includes media such as painting, photography, installation, new media, textiles and public art. In her paintings and sculpture she often uses shades of pink. Her work also reflects on her relationship to skin and she interprets body paint designs and scarification marks in a contemporary manner.

In 2013 she was commissioned by the Brisbane Botanic Gardens to install her sculpture Feast of the Bon-yi in bronze and corten steel there on Mount Coot-tha. The cluster of large nuts and spirit figures visualises the gathering of the tribes. The nut itself symbolises a sacred object, it provides nourishment, rebirth and growth and is the reason why people travelled from so far and wide.

References 

 https://visualarts.net.au/podcasts/episode-42-bianca-beetson/

Australian women artists
Australian Aboriginal artists
Living people
Year of birth missing (living people)
Wiradjuri people
Queensland University of Technology alumni
People from South West Queensland